Tynovo is a rural locality (a village) in Korotovskoye Rural Settlement, Cherepovetsky District, Vologda Oblast, Russia. The population was 20 as of 2002.

Geography 
Tynovo is located 68 km northeast of Cherepovets (the district's administrative centre) by road. Kotovo is the nearest rural locality.

References 

Rural localities in Cherepovetsky District